Mary Dalva Proença(born 3 March 1935) is a Brazilian diver. She competed in the women's 10 metre platform event at the 1956 Summer Olympics.

References

External links
 

1935 births
Living people
Brazilian female divers
Olympic divers of Brazil
Divers at the 1956 Summer Olympics
Divers from Rio de Janeiro (city)
Sportspeople from Rio de Janeiro (city)
20th-century Brazilian women